Latvia participated in the Eurovision Song Contest 2004 with the song "Dziesma par laimi" written by Tomass Kleins and Guntars Račs. The song was performed by Fomins and Kleins. The Latvian broadcaster Latvijas Televīzija (LTV) organised the national final Eirodziesma 2004 in order to select the Latvian entry for the 2004 contest in Istanbul, Turkey. Ten songs were selected to compete in the national final on 28 February 2004 where two rounds of public televoting selected "Dziesma par laimi" performed by Fomins and Kleins as the winner. This was the first time that the Latvian song was performed in the Latvian language at the Eurovision Song Contest.

Latvia competed in the semi-final of the Eurovision Song Contest which took place on 12 May 2004. Performing during for the show in position 4, "Dziesma par laimi" was not announced among the top 10 entries of the semi-final and therefore did not qualify to compete in the final. It was later revealed that Latvia placed seventeenth out of the 22 participating countries in the semi-final with 23 points.

Background 

Prior to the 2004 contest, Latvia had participated in the Eurovision Song Contest four times since its first entry in 2000. Latvia won the contest once in 2002 with the song "I Wanna" performed by Marie N. Their 2003 entry "Hello from Mars" performed by F.L.Y. placed twenty-fourth. The Latvian national broadcaster, Latvijas Televīzija (LTV), which broadcasts the event within Latvia and organises the selection process for the nation's entry, confirmed their intentions to participate at the 2004 Eurovision Song Contest on 30 September 2003. Latvia has selected their entries for the Eurovision Song Contest through a national final. Since their debut in 2000, LTV had organised the selection show Eirodziesma. Along with their participation confirmation, the broadcaster announced that they would organise Eirodziesma 2004 in order to select the Latvian entry for the 2004 contest.

Before Eurovision

Eirodziesma 2004 
Eirodziesma 2004 was the fifth edition of Eirodziesma, the music competition that selects Latvia's entries for the Eurovision Song Contest. The competition took place at the Olympic Center in Ventspils on 28 February 2004, hosted by Dāvids Ernštreits and Ija Circene and broadcast on LTV1. The show was watched by 706,000 viewers in Latvia.

Competing entries 
Artists and songwriters were able to submit their entries to the broadcaster between 1 October 2003 and 15 November 2003. A record 69 entries were submitted at the conclusion of the submission period. A jury panel appointed by LTV evaluated the submitted songs and selected ten entries for the competition. The jury panel consisted of SKAMP (2001 Lithuanian Eurovision entrant), Urban Trad (2003 Belgian Eurovision entrant), Alf Poier (2003 Austrian Eurovision entrant), One (2002 Cypriot Eurovision entrant), Marius Bratten (Swedish director), Tim Gruhl (German journalist), Ivar Must (Estonian composer), Rolands Ūdris (singer), Alec Matko (International Coordinator of OGAE) and members of the LTV Eurovision team. The ten competing artists and songs were announced during a press conference on 3 December 2003.

Final 
The final took place on 28 February 2004. Ten acts competed and the winner was selected over two rounds of public televoting. In the first round, the top three songs advanced to the second round, the superfinal. In the superfinal, "Dziesma par laimi" performed by Fomins and Kleins was declared the winner. In addition to the performances of the competing entries, guest performers included the project re:public, 2003 Latvian Eurovision entrant F.L.Y., 2003 Latvian Junior Eurovision entrant Dzintars Čīča, 2004 Estonian Eurovision entrant Neiokõsõ, 2004 Finnish Eurovision entrant Jari Sillanpää, 2004 Maltese Eurovision entrant Julie and Ludwig, and 2004 Ukrainian Eurovision entrant Ruslana.

Promotion 
Fomins and Kleins specifically promoted "Dziesma par laimi" as the Latvian Eurovision entry by taking part in promotional activities in Lithuania on 8 and 9 April, including a performance at the Club Egivela in Panevėžys on 9 April. Estonian, Lithuanian, Ukrainian, English, German and Belarusian language versions of "Dziesma par laimi" was also recorded by the artists, with the Belarusian version being recorded together with 2004 Belarusian Eurovision entrant Aleksandra and Konstantin on 15 April.

At Eurovision
It was announced that the competition's format would be expanded to include a semi-final in 2004. According to the rules, all nations with the exceptions of the host country, the "Big Four" (France, Germany, Spain and the United Kingdom) and the ten highest placed finishers in the 2003 contest are required to qualify from the semi-final on 12 May 2004 in order to compete for the final on 15 May 2004; the top ten countries from the semi-final progress to the final. On 23 March 2004, a special allocation draw was held which determined the running order for the semi-final and Latvia was set to perform in position 4, following the entry from Switzerland and before the entry from Israel. At the end of the semi-final, Latvia was not announced among the top 10 entries in the semi-final and therefore failed to qualify to compete in the final. It was later revealed that Latvia placed seventeenth in the semi-final, receiving a total of 23 points.

The semi-final and the final were broadcast in Latvia on LTV1 with all shows featuring commentary by Kārlis Streips. The Latvian spokesperson, who announced the Latvian votes during the final, was Lauris Reiniks.

Voting 
Below is a breakdown of points awarded to Latvia and awarded by Latvia in the semi-final and grand final of the contest. The nation awarded its 12 points to Estonia in the semi-final and to Ukraine in the final of the contest.

Points awarded to Latvia

Points awarded by Latvia

References

2004
Countries in the Eurovision Song Contest 2004
Eurovision